Saidabad (also Romanized as Sa‘īdābād) is a village in Saidabad Rural District of the Central District of Shahriar County, Tehran province, Iran. At the 2006 National Census, its population was 13,215 in 3,401 households. The following census in 2011 counted 14,519 people in 4,087 households. The latest census in 2016 showed a population of 16,212 people in 4,796 households; it was the largest village in its rural district.

References 

Shahriar County

Populated places in Tehran Province

Populated places in Shahriar County